Best Television Program is one of the categories of the Edda Awards.

1999-2006 

Edda Awards